Santipur Assembly constituency is an assembly constituency in Nadia district in the Indian state of West Bengal.

Overview
As per orders of the Delimitation Commission, No. 86 Santipur Assembly constituency is composed of the following: Shantipur municipality, and Babla, Baganchra, Belgoria I, Belgoria II Gayeshpur and Haripur gram panchayats of the Santipur community development block.

Santipur Assembly constituency is part of No. 13 Ranaghat (Lok Sabha constituency) (SC). It was earlier part of Nabadwip (Lok Sabha constituency).

Members of Legislative Assembly

Election results

2021 By-election

2021 Assembly Election

2016
In the 2016 elections, the 6 times MLA Ajoy Dey was defeated by the West Bengal State Youth Congress, President, Arindam Bhattacharya. Arindam Bhattacharya a young leader and a corporate and International Trade Law expert registered a historical win over his rival, securing a 1,03,566 (52.25%) votes with a winning margin of 19,488 votes.

2014 General election

Santipur Assembly constituency is part of Ranaghat (Lok Sabha constituency). Ranaghat went to the polls on May 12, 2014 in phase 5 of the 2014 general election in West Bengal. The result of Santipur in this election is given below.

! colspan="2" |Party
!Candidate
!Valid Votes
!Votes recorded on Postal Ballot papers
|- class="unsortable" style="background-color:#E9E9E9"
|-
| 
| style="text-align:left;" |AITC
| style="text-align:left;" |Tapas Mandal
|69,651
| rowspan="7" |N/A
|-
| 
| style="text-align:left;" |CPI(M)
| style="text-align:left;" |Archana Biswas
|52,403
|-
| 
| style="text-align:left;" |BJP
| style="text-align:left;" |Supravat Biswas
|31,070
|-
| 
| style="text-align:left;" |INC
| style="text-align:left;" |Pratap Kanti Ray
|25,885
|-
| colspan="3" style="text-align:left;" |Rejected Votes
|0
|-
| colspan="3" style="text-align:left;" |NOTA
|2,122
|-
| colspan="3" style="text-align:left;" |Tendered Votes
|0
|-
! colspan="3" style="text-align:right;" |Majority
| colspan="2" |17,248
|-
! colspan="3" style="text-align:right;" |Turnout
| colspan="2" |186,767
|-
|}

2014 By-election
A by-election was held on 12 April 2014 following the resignation of the sitting MLA, Ajoy Dey who switched over to Trinamool Congress from Congress.

2011
In the 2011 election, Ajoy Dey of Congress defeated his nearest rival Yar Mullick of RCPI.

.# Swing calculated on CPI(M)'s vote percentage in 2006.

1977–2006
In the 2006, 2001, 1996 and 1991 state assembly elections, Ajoy Dey of Congress won the Santipur seat, defeating his nearest rivals Sanatanu Chakrabarti of CPI (M), Badal Basak, Independent, Bimalananda Mukherjee of RCPI (R), and Asim Ghosh of RCPI in respective years. Contests in most years were multi cornered but only winners and runners are being mentioned. In 1987, 1982 and 1977, Bimalananda Mukherjee, RCPI/Independent candidate defeated Ajay Dey, Asamanja De (both of Congress) and Jnanendra Nath Pramanik of Janata Party in the respective years.

1951–1972
Asamanja De of Congress won in 1972. Bimalananda Mukherjee of RCPI won in 1971. M. Mokshed Ali of RCPI won in 1969. K.Pal of CPI(M) won in 1967. Kanai Pal, Independent, won in 1962. Haridas Dey of Congress won in 1957. In independent India's first election in 1951, Sashi Bhusan Khan of Congress won the Santipur seat.

References

Assembly constituencies of West Bengal
Politics of Nadia district